Cheyenne Parker (born August 22, 1992) is an American professional basketball player for the Atlanta Dream of the Women's National Basketball Association (WNBA).

Early life
Parker was born and raised in Queens, New York and grew up in a single mother home. Later on in life, she and her mother moved to High Point, North Carolina to help accommodate her with more basketball opportunities. She enrolled at Southwest Guilford High School and played for the girls' basketball team.

College career
After graduating from Southwest Guilford High School, Parker enrolled at High Point University. She played for the women's basketball team from 2010 to 2013. However, upon her senior season she was dismissed by the team due to a failed drug test, it was for marijuana. Due to the violation she had to sit out the entire 2013–14 college season. In 2014, Parker transferred to Middle Tennessee State University, where she put up college career-high numbers in scoring and shooting percentage.

College statistics

Source

Professional career

WNBA
Parker was drafted 5th overall in the 2015 WNBA draft by the Chicago Sky. In her rookie season, Parker played 30 games off the bench, averaging 2.2 points per game during the regular season. The Sky had finished second in the eastern conference with a 21–13 record, but were eliminated 2–1 by the Indiana Fever in the first round.

In her second season, Parker made her first career start and finished off the season with 7 starts in 25 games played, averaging 4.0 points per game. Under the league's new playoff format, the Sky finished fourth in the league with an 18–16 record, receiving a bye to the second round. They defeated the Atlanta Dream in the second round elimination game. In the semi-finals, the Sky lost 3–1 to the Los Angeles Sparks, who won the championship that year.

In the 2017 season, Parker played all games off the bench, averaging 3.0 points per game in 23 games played. The Sky missed out on the playoffs with a 12–22 record.

In 2018, Parker had a breakout season and added three-point shooting to her skill set. On June 3, 2018, she scored a career-high 20 points along with a career-high 13 rebounds in a 95–90 victory over the Las Vegas Aces. On July 31, 2018, Parker tied her career-high of 20 points with a game winning putback in a 92–91 victory over the Dallas Wings. Parker finished off the season averaging career-highs in every statistical category while playing 34 games with 5 starts. The Sky finished 13–21, missing out on the playoffs for the second year in a row.

In 2019, Parker re-signed with the Sky to a 2-year contract. Parker would continue to be weapon off the bench for the Sky in the 2019 season. On June 24, 2019, Parker scored a new career-high 22 points in a 93–75 win over the Connecticut Sun. Later on in the season, Parker tied her career-high of 22 points in a 93–85 loss to the Minnesota Lynx. For the first time since 2016, the Sky would make it back to the playoffs finishing as the number 4 seed with a 20–14 record. By the end of the season, Parker would average new career-highs in blocks and free throw shooting. In the first round elimination game, they defeated the Phoenix Mercury 105–76 to advance. In the second round elimination game, the Sky were defeated by the Las Vegas Aces 93–92 in heartbreaking fashion, as Dearica Hamby made a late game three-pointer from half-court to put the Aces up by one with 4 seconds left.

In 2020, Parker would have the best season of her career, putting up new career-high numbers in scoring, assists, rebounds and shooting percentages. In the shortened 22-game season (played in the IMG Academy bubble due to the COVID-19 pandemic) she started in 13 of the 20 games played. On September 6, 2020, Parker scored a new career-high 24 points along with 10 rebounds in a 86–80 loss to the Los Angeles Sparks. The Sky would finish 12–10 with the number 6 seed in the league, but were eliminated by the Connecticut Sun in the first round elimination game.

In 2021, Parker signed with the Atlanta Dream.

Overseas
From 2015 to 2017, Parker played a couple off-seasons in China for Henan Phoenix. In the 2017–18 WNBA off-season, Parker played in Poland for Wisla Can Pack. In 2018, Parker signed with Bucheon KEB Hana Bank of the South Korean League for the 2018–19 off-season. In 2019, Parker signed with the Sichuan Blue Whales of the Chinese League for the 2019–20 off-season. In September 2020, Parker signed with Basket Lattes of the French league for the 2020–21 off-season.

WNBA career statistics

Regular season

|-
| style="text-align:left;"| 2015
| style="text-align:left;"| Chicago
| 30 || 0 || 9.3 || .400 || .000 || .385 || 2.5 || 0.2 || 0.2 || 0.7 || 0.5 || 2.2
|-
| style="text-align:left;"| 2016
| style="text-align:left;"| Chicago
| 25 || 7 || 12.6|| .506 || .000 || .531 || 3.2 || 0.2 || 0.4 || 0.2 || 0.8 || 4.0
|-
| style="text-align:left;"| 2017
| style="text-align:left;"| Chicago
| 23 || 0 || 12.4 || .464 || .000|| .639 || 3.4 || 0.6 || 0.3 || 0.6 || 0.9 || 3.8
|-
| style="text-align:left;"| 2018
| style="text-align:left;"| Chicago
| 34 || 5 || 19.7 || .531 || .316|| .713 || 5.8 || 0.7 || 0.5 || 1.0 || 1.4 || 10.0
|-
| style="text-align:left;"| 2019
| style="text-align:left;"| Chicago
| 34 || 0 || 19.7 || .459 || .278 || .842 || 5.8 || 0.9 || 0.7 || 1.2 || 1.3 || 8.8
|-
| style="text-align:left;"| 2020
| style="text-align:left;"| Chicago
| 20 || 13 || 24.9 || .554 || .469 || .855 || 6.4 || 1.5 || 1.3 || 0.9 || 2.8 || 13.4
|-
| style="text-align:left;"| 2021
| style="text-align:left;"| Atlanta
| 13 || 11 || 20.8 || .455 || .333 || .786 || 4.5 || 1.2 || 1.2 || 0.9 || 1.3 || 10.2
|-
| style="text-align:left;"| 2022
| style="text-align:left;"| Atlanta
| 36 || 35 || 26.2 || .500 || .218 || .795 || 6.2 || 2.0 || 1.1 || 0.9 || 2.0 || 11.8
|-
| style="text-align:left;"| Career
| style="text-align:left;"| 8 years, 2 teams
| 215 || 71 || 18.3 || .495 || .304 || .741 || 4.8 || 0.9 || 0.7 || 0.8 || 1.4 || 8.0

Playoffs

|-
| style="text-align:left;"| 2015
| style="text-align:left;"| Chicago
| 2 || 0 || 7.0 || .667 || .000 || .000 || 1.5 || 0.0 || 0.0 || 0.0 ||  0.0 || 2.0
|-
| style="text-align:left;"| 2016
| style="text-align:left;"| Chicago
| 5 || 0 || 9.5 || .333 || .000 || .500 || 1.8 || 0.4 || 0.2 || 0.0 || 0.6 || 2.8
|-
| style="text-align:left;"| 2019
| style="text-align:left;"| Chicago
| 2 || 0 || 21.8 || .438 || .000 || .833 || 5.5 || 1.0 || 1.5 || 1.0 || 1.0 || 9.5
|-
| style="text-align:left;"| 2020
| style="text-align:left;"| Chicago
| 1 || 1 || 25.0 || .250 || .000 || 1.000 || 8.0 || 3.0 || 2.0 || 1.0 || 3.0 || 8.0
|-
| style="text-align:left;"| Career
| style="text-align:left;"|4 years, 1 team
| 10 || 1 || 13.0 || .400 || .000 || .708 || 3.1 || 0.7 || 0.6 || 0.3 || 0.8 || 4.5

References

External links
Middle Tennessee Blue Raiders bio

1992 births
Living people
American expatriate basketball people in China
American women's basketball players
Atlanta Dream players
Basketball players from New York City
Chicago Sky draft picks
Chicago Sky players
Henan Phoenix players
High Point Panthers women's basketball players
Middle Tennessee Blue Raiders women's basketball players
Power forwards (basketball)
Sportspeople from Queens, New York